Gastornithiformes were an extinct order of giant flightless fowl with fossils found in North America, Eurasia, and possibly Australia.  Members of Gastornithidae were long considered to be a part of the order Gruiformes. However, the traditional concept of Gruiformes has since been shown to be an unnatural grouping. 

Beginning in the late 1980s and the first phylogenetic analysis of gastornithid relationships, consensus began to grow that they were close relatives of the lineage that includes waterfowl and screamers, the Anseriformes. Recognizing the apparent close relationship between gastornis and waterfowl, some researchers even classify them within the anseriform group itself. Others restrict the name Anseriformes only to the crown group formed by all modern species, and label the larger group including extinct relatives of anseriformes in the clade Anserimorphae (which this article and related pages have adopted). While the order is generally considered to be monotypic, a 2017 paper concerning the evolution and phylogeny of giant fowl by Worthy and colleagues have found phylogenetic support in finding the mihirungs (Dromornithidae) to be the sister taxon to the gastornis. 

The mihirungs are also another family of giant flightless birds that have been classified as anserimorphs either as crown anseriforms closely related to the screamers (Anhimidae) or the sister taxon to Anseriformes. Worthy et al. (2017) incorporated several new taxa and character traits into existing matrices of Galloanserae resulted in several of their phylogenies to support this grouping. The authors did note the bootstrap support is weakly supported and one of their phylogenies even found gastornithiforms to be stem galliforms instead. These were also weakly supported. Below is a simplified phylogeny showing their one phylogeny supporting gastornithiforms as anserimorphs.

In a 2021 paper by Agnolin found the Argentinian genus Brontornis from the Miocene deposits, normally considered to be a terror bird, found to a gastornithiform sister to the mihirungs.

References

 
Bird orders
Extinct flightless birds
Taxa named by Leonhard Stejneger